The Cagsawa Ruins (also spelled as Kagsawa, historically spelled as Cagsaua) are the remnants of a 16th-century Franciscan church, the Cagsawa church. It was originally built in the town of Cagsawa in 1587 but was burned down and destroyed by Dutch pirates in 1636. It was rebuilt in 1724 by Fr. Francisco Blanco, but was destroyed again, along with the town of Cagsawa, on February 1, 1814, during the eruption of the Mayon Volcano.

The ruins are currently located in Barangay Busay, Cagsawa, in the municipality of Daraga, Albay, Philippines.
It is part of Cagsawa Park, is protected and maintained by the municipal government of Daraga and the National Museum of the Philippines, and is one of the most popular tourist destinations in the area. The Internationale Tourismus-Börse Berlin, one of the world's top travel trade shows based in Berlin, has even recognized the site as one of the places to visit in Asia. A preliminary excavation of the Cagsawa ruins by the Bulacan State University, show that the Spanish incorporated Mesoamerican influences in constructing the complex.

Location
They are also  from the Legazpi Airport and a 55-minute flight from Manila. By bus, the location is 12 to 14 hours away from Manila.

It is considered symbolic of the dangers of living in close proximity with Mt. Mayon, as it is situated roughly 11 kilometres (6.8 mi) away from the volcano.

History

The baroque church of Cagsawa was originally built in 1587 in the small town of Cagsawa (spelled as Cagsaua during the Hispanic era in the Philippines). The church, however, was burned down by Dutch pirates on July 25, 1636. In 1724, the church was rebuilt by Franciscan friars under Father Francisco Blanco.

On February 1, 1814, the strongest eruption recorded to date of the Mayon volcano buried the town of Cagsawa and its surrounding areas under several hundred million cubic meters of tephra and lahar, killing an estimated 2,000 people. Hundreds of inhabitants of the town of Cagsawa purportedly sought refuge in the church, but were also killed by pyroclastic flows and lahar. Only the belfry and some parts of the convent survive today, though parts of the crumbling facade were still standing long after the 1814 eruption as attested by photographs. It is believed that the facade of the structure collapsed due to earthquakes that hit the area in the 1950s.

Survivors of the 1814 eruption resettled into the nearby Daraga, which was then a mere barrio of the destroyed town of Cagsawa, and decided to merge the two. However, the Cagsawa church should not be confused with the intact church of Nuestra Señora de la Porteria (locally known as the Daraga Church), built in 1773 and also located in the municipality of Daraga.

Cagsawa was also subjected to the Super Typhoon Durian (designated Typhoon Reming by PAGASA) in 2006. The ruins were unharmed even as the typhoon devastated the surrounding countryside with mudslides and lahar that killed at least 1,266 people. The incident is similar to another catastrophe in the same region in 1825, shortly after the 1814 Mayon eruption.

Tourism

The ruins of the Cagsawa church now stands as the site of the Cagsawa Ruins Park, one of the most popular tourist destinations in Albay. It is also the site of the Cagsawa Branch of the National Museum of the Philippines, also known as the Cagsawa National Museum. The museum was established on land that was donated by the municipality of Daraga to the National Museum on January 26, 1981.[6]

It was formally inaugurated on October 30, 1992, and is the third largest regional branch of the National Museum. It houses a collection of photographs of the volcanic eruptions of Mount Mayon as well as various geological and archeological exhibits.

In addition, Cagsawa also provides all-terrain-vehicle (ATV) tours which allow tourists to trail down the lava front in Barangay Mabinit.

Cagsawa Festival
The Cagsawa Festival is the latest addition to the celebrated festivals of Albay province, and has recently joined the ranks of the province's major festivals. It was launched in 2012 by the province and the municipal government of Daraga. The festival showcases various activities and entertainment such as outdoor and sport events, culinary activities, and cultural presentations of dances and plays.

In line with this, the Pintura Cagsawa was also introduced, which provides venue for artists to showcase their works through body painting. It is solely on this festival in the province that body art is explored and showcased.

Last February 1, 2014, the province of Albay commemorated the 200th anniversary of the 1814 eruption by holding the Cagsawa Festival, “Cagsawa Dos Siglos.” The festival aimed to pay tribute to the strength and resiliency of the people in Albay. According to Joey Salceda, Albay governor, Albayanos (local name for people from Albay) are aware that they live within the shadow of a beautiful yet dangerous volcano every day. Thus, the anniversary of the 1814 eruption also serves as a reminder of the town's commitment to disaster risk reduction as part of their way of life to be able to achieve their goals of development for the community.

References

External links

Cagsawa National Museum Official Site

Buildings and structures in Albay
Church ruins in the Philippines
Roman Catholic churches in Albay
Spanish Colonial architecture in the Philippines
Tourist attractions in Albay